Wojtek Fibak and Jan Kodeš were the defending champions, but Fibak did not participate this year.   Kodeš partnered Jiří Hřebec, losing in the semifinals.

Juan Gisbert Sr. and Manuel Orantes won the title, defeating Jürgen Fassbender and Hans-Jürgen Pohmann 1–6, 6–3, 6–2, 2–3(r) in the final.

Seeds

Draw

Draw

External links
Draw

1976 Grand Prix (tennis)
Doubles